Holmelgonia is a genus of African dwarf spiders that was first described by R. Jocqué & N. Scharff in 2007.

Species
 it contains seventeen species, found in Angola, Burundi, Cameroon, Middle Africa, Kenya, Malawi, Tanzania, and Uganda:
Holmelgonia afromontana Nzigidahera & Jocqué, 2014 – Burundi
Holmelgonia annemetteae (Scharff, 1990) – Tanzania
Holmelgonia annulata (Jocqué & Scharff, 1986) – Tanzania
Holmelgonia basalis (Jocqué & Scharff, 1986) – Tanzania
Holmelgonia bosnasutus Nzigidahera & Jocqué, 2014 – Burundi
Holmelgonia brachystegiae (Jocqué, 1981) – Malawi
Holmelgonia disconveniens Nzigidahera & Jocqué, 2014 – Burundi
Holmelgonia falciformis (Scharff, 1990) – Tanzania
Holmelgonia hirsuta (Miller, 1970) – Angola
Holmelgonia holmi (Miller, 1970) – Cameroon, Congo
Holmelgonia limpida (Miller, 1970) – Angola
Holmelgonia nemoralis (Holm, 1962) (type) – Congo, Uganda, Kenya
Holmelgonia perturbatrix (Jocqué & Scharff, 1986) – Tanzania
Holmelgonia producta (Bosmans, 1988) – Cameroon
Holmelgonia projecta (Jocqué & Scharff, 1986) – Tanzania
Holmelgonia rungwensis (Jocqué & Scharff, 1986) – Tanzania
Holmelgonia stoltzei (Jocqué & Scharff, 1986) – Tanzania

See also
 List of Linyphiidae species (A–H)

References

Araneomorphae genera
Linyphiidae
Spiders of Africa